Muhammad Faizal bin Muhammad Talib (born 28 July 1997) is a Malaysian footballer who plays  as a winger for Malaysia Super League club Kedah Darul Aman.

Club career

Kedah Darul Aman
On 19 December 2022, Faizal signed a one-year contract with Malaysia Super League club Kedah Darul Aman.

References

External links
 

1997 births
Living people
Malaysian footballers
Melaka United F.C. players
Penang F.C. players
Kedah Darul Aman F.C. players
Malaysia Super League players
Association football forwards
People from Malacca